Shergarh is a small village in the Sirsa district of Haryana, India, abutting the border of Haryana and Punjab.

Villages in Sirsa district